General elections were held in the Dominican Republic on 16 May 1982. Salvador Jorge Blanco of the Dominican Revolutionary Party won the presidential election, whilst his party also won the parliamentary elections. Voter turnout was 71.6%.

Results

President

Congress

References

Dominican Republic
1982 in the Dominican Republic
Elections in the Dominican Republic
Presidential elections in the Dominican Republic
Election and referendum articles with incomplete results
May 1982 events in North America